Meeker County is a county in the U.S. state of Minnesota. As of the 2020 census, the population was 23,400. Its county seat is Litchfield.

History
The Wisconsin Territory was established by the federal government effective July 3, 1836, and existed until its eastern portion was granted statehood (as Wisconsin) in 1848. The federal government set up the Minnesota Territory effective March 3, 1849. The newly organized territorial legislature created nine counties across the territory in October of that year. One of those original counties, Dakota, had portions partitioned off to create Cass (1851), Nicollet (1853), Pierce (1853), and Sibley (1853) counties. In 1855 portions of those counties were carved out to create Davis, and on February 23, 1856, the territorial legislature created Meeker County from a portion of Davis. It was named for Bradley B. Meeker (1813-1873), who served on the Minnesota Territorial Supreme Court from 1849 to 1853. The area of Forest City was first settled in the 1850s, and the village was named the county seat in 1856. It was platted as Forest City in 1857.

In 1856 the first settlers moved into the future Litchfield; the resulting settlement was named Ness. The area grew, and with the arrival of a spur from the St. Paul and Pacific Railroad, the vote was taken to move the county seat to this area in the fall of 1869. Upon being platted in 1869, the city was renamed Litchfield.

On March 20, 1858, the western portion of Meeker County was partitioned off to create Kandiyohi County. Meeker County's boundaries have remained unchanged since then.

Geography
Meeker County's terrain consists of low rolling hills, lightly wooded and heavily dotted with lakes and ponds. The available area is devoted to agriculture. The terrain slopes to the south and east, with its highest point just southwest of Lake Hope, 7.9 miles (12.7 km) west-southwest of Litchfield, at 1,261' (384m) ASL.

Major highways

  U.S. Highway 12
  Minnesota State Highway 4
  Minnesota State Highway 7
  Minnesota State Highway 15
  Minnesota State Highway 22
  Minnesota State Highway 24
  Minnesota State Highway 55

Adjacent counties

 Stearns County - north
 Wright County - east
 McLeod County - southeast
 Renville County - southwest
 Kandiyohi County - west

Protected areas

 Acton State Wildlife Management Area
 Greenleaf Lake State Recreation Area
 Greenleaf State Wildlife Management Area
 Knapp State Wildlife Management Area (part)
 Madsen State Wildlife Management Area
 Popular State Wildlife Management Area
 Wieker State Wildlife Management Area

Demographics

2020 census

Note: the US Census treats Hispanic/Latino as an ethnic category. This table excludes Latinos from the racial categories and assigns them to a separate category. Hispanics/Latinos can be of any race.

2000 census

As of the 2000 census, there were 22,644 people, 8,590 households, and 6,133 families in the county. The population density was 37.2/sqmi (14.4/km2). There were 9,821 housing units at an average density of 16.2/sqmi (6.24/km2). The racial makeup of the county was 97.35% White, 0.19% Black or African American, 0.18% Native American, 0.40% Asian, 1.40% from other races, and 0.48% from two or more races. 2.15% of the population were Hispanic or Latino of any race. 45.8% were of German, 12.2% Swedish and 11.3% Norwegian ancestry.

There were 8,590 households, out of which 33.70% had children under the age of 18 living with them, 61.50% were married couples living together, 6.30% had a female householder with no husband present, and 28.60% were non-families. 24.40% of all households were made up of individuals, and 12.00% had someone living alone who was 65 years of age or older. The average household size was 2.58 and the average family size was 3.07.

The county population contained 27.00% under the age of 18, 7.40% from 18 to 24, 26.40% from 25 to 44, 23.00% from 45 to 64, and 16.30% who were 65 years of age or older. The median age was 38 years. For every 100 females there were 101.70 males. For every 100 females age 18 and over, there were 98.90 males.

The median income for a household in the county was $40,908, and the median income for a family was $47,923. Males had a median income of $33,157 versus $22,743 for females. The per capita income for the county was $18,628. About 4.70% of families and 7.10% of the population were below the poverty line, including 6.40% of those under age 18 and 13.80% of those age 65 or over.

Communities

Cities

 Cedar Mills
 Cosmos
 Darwin
 Dassel
 Eden Valley (part)
 Grove City
 Kingston
 Litchfield (county seat)
 Watkins

Unincorporated communities

 Acton
 Beckville
 Corvuso
 Crow River
 Forest City
 Greenleaf
 Jennie
 Lamson
 Manannah
 Rosendale
 Strout

Townships

 Acton Township
 Cedar Mills Township
 Collinwood Township
 Cosmos Township
 Danielson Township
 Darwin Township
 Dassel Township
 Ellsworth Township
 Forest City Township
 Forest Prairie Township
 Greenleaf Township
 Harvey Township
 Kingston Township
 Litchfield Township
 Manannah Township
 Swede Grove Township
 Union Grove Township

Politics
Meeker County usually votes Republican. In 78% of national elections since 1980 the county selected the Republican Party candidate (as of 2020).

Notable people
 Magnus Johnson (1871-1936) - local farmer and United States Senator (1923-1925)

See also
 National Register of Historic Places listings in Meeker County, Minnesota

References

External links
 Meeker County government’s website

 
Minnesota counties
1856 establishments in Minnesota Territory
Populated places established in 1856